Tristan Paul Mack Wilds (born July 15, 1989) is an American actor, singer-songwriter, and record producer. He is known for his roles as Michael Lee on the HBO original drama series, The Wire, and as Dixon Wilson on the CW teen drama series, 90210. He was also featured in the Adele music video for "Hello". His debut album, New York: A Love Story was released on September 30, 2013 and was nominated for the Best Urban Contemporary Album at the Grammy Awards in 2014. Wilds' second album, AfterHours was released on April 7, 2017.

Early life and education
Wilds was born and grew up in Staten Island, New York City. His mother, Monique Moncion, is of Afro-Dominican and Irish descent, and his father, Paul Wilds, is African-American. His mother was first a beautician and then a stockbroker. Wilds attended and graduated from the Michael J. Petrides School in Staten Island.

Acting career
His acting debut came in Miracle's Boys, a drama mini-series produced by Spike Lee on The N (now called TeenNick). He also made guest appearances on television shows such as Cold Case and Law & Order. In 2006, Wilds made his film debut in a bit-role in the independent drama film Half Nelson alongside Academy Award nominee Ryan Gosling. That same year, Wilds joined the cast of the HBO drama television series, The Wire (then into its fourth season) in a major recurring role as Michael Lee, a smart but troubled middle school student who lives in poverty and cares for his younger brother.

In 2007, Wilds appeared in the music videos for songs such as "Roc Boys", "Teenage Love Affair" and "Ghetto Mindstate", among others.  In 2008, he appeared alongside Queen Latifah, Alicia Keys, and Dakota Fanning in The Secret Life of Bees, the film adaptation of the novel of the same name. Soon after his run on The Wire, he attended an acting workshop at the Roundabout Theatre Company where he worked alongside actress, Phylicia Rashad in productions of Stockholm Brooklyn and Wool at the Cherry Lane Theatre.
 
In 2008, Wilds returned to television in The CW's teen drama series, 90210, a spin-off of Beverly Hills, 90210. He played Dixon Wilson, a teenage boy who is adopted and moves with his family to Beverly Hills. The show ran until 2013. In March 2009, he secured a role in the George Lucas-produced war film Red Tails. The film follows the Tuskegee Airmen, a group of African American United States Army Air Force (USAAF) servicemen, during World War II. Wilds portrayed Ray "Ray Gun" Knight. The film, which also starred Cuba Gooding, Jr. and Terrence Howard, was eventually released in January 2012 after numerous push-backs.
 
In 2015, Wilds starred as Adele's love interest in the music video for her song, "Hello", directed by Xavier Dolan. In early 2016, he starred in the VH1 television movie, The Breaks about the hip hop industry in the 1990s. On the heels of its successful January TV movie premiere, VH1 greenlighted a full first season for the hip-hop drama, which started airing in 2017. That year, Wilds also played Officer Beck, the Black officer at the center of the controversial shooting of a young white male in a racially charged town in the TV show Shots Fired.

Music career
Wilds met producer Salaam Remi in 2008 at the BMI Awards, which sparked Wilds' initial interest in becoming a music artist. In 2010, Wilds signed a recording contract with independent record label, Ten2one. He released several singles, including "2 Girlz" which was featured on the fourth season of his TV show, 90210. The song Fall 4 Her was produced by Rico Love. Wilds' debut EP, Remember Remember, was released toward the end of 2011.
 
Wilds began working with Salaam Remi on his debut studio album in 2012. He signed to Remi's Sony Music imprint, Louder than Life, that same year. He released the first single off the album, "Own It," in June 2013. The album, New York: A Love Story, was released in September 2013. It was well received by critics earning a Grammy nomination for the Best Urban Contemporary Album at the 56th Grammy Awards in 2014. The album would lose to Rihanna's Unapologetic. In November 2015, Wilds released the first single, "Love in the 90z", off his second album AfterHours. In March 2016, it was announced that Wilds had signed a management deal with Roc Nation.

Discography

Studio albums

Singles

Guest appearances

Filmography

Awards and nominations

Film

Television

Music

References

External links

 
 

21st-century American male actors
21st-century American singers
African-American male actors
20th-century African-American male singers
American male child actors
American male film actors
American male television actors
American people of Dominican Republic descent
American people of Irish descent
Hispanic and Latino American male actors
Living people
Male actors from New York City
People from Staten Island
21st-century American male singers
1988 births
21st-century African-American male singers